Gaetano Lapis (1704 – 1 April 1776) was an Italian painter of the late-Baroque period.

Biography
He was born in Cagli and trained under Sebastiano Conca. He painted a Birth of Venus for the ceiling of the Palazzo Borghese in Rome. He painted the main altarpiece depicting St Michael Archangel for the church of San Giuseppe, Cagli.

References

1706 births
1773 deaths
People from the Province of Pesaro and Urbino
18th-century Italian people
18th-century Italian painters
Italian male painters
Italian Baroque painters
18th-century Italian male artists